Buchs-Dällikon is a railway station in Switzerland. The station is situated in the municipality of Buchs, but also serves the adjacent municipality of Dällikon. Both municipalities are situated in the Furttal region in the canton of Zürich. The station is located on the Wettingen-Effretikon railway line (Furttal line).

The station should not be confused with Buchs AG railway station (located in Buchs, canton of Aargau) or with Buchs SG railway station (located in Buchs, canton of St. Gallen).

Infrastructure 
Buchs-Dällikon station was completely renewed between 2005 and 2008, and the former station building was removed. The station is equipped with a park & rail facility (parking lot) to the south, and bicycle parkings. There are two tracks but only one side platform. The second track is used for crossing cargo trains, which use the mostly single-tracked Furttal line to bypass the city center of Zürich.

Service 
Buchs-Dällikon station is served by line S6 of the Zurich S-Bahn.
On weekends, there is a nighttime S-Bahn service (SN6) offered by ZVV.

Summary of all S-Bahn services:

 Zürich S-Bahn:
 Nighttime S-Bahn (only during weekends):

The station is also served by regional bus routes of Verkehrsbetriebe Glattal (VBG).

Former Buchs ZH railway station 

Buchs used to have a second railway station on the Bülach-Baden railway line, which connected the Furttal line near Otelfingen with the Oerlikon-Bülach line in Niederglatt. Since the 1920s, the Swiss Federal Railways had plans to close this line. After 1934, the station building was unattended.The last passenger train called at this station on 17 January 1937.

The former station building in the upper part of the village remained, but the tracks have been mostly removed in 1969. The tracks are used by the adjacent industry.

Gallery

References

External links 

Video of Buchs-Dällikon railway station on YouTube

Railway stations in the canton of Zürich
Swiss Federal Railways stations